The 1982 Monaco Grand Prix was a Formula One motor race held at Monaco on 23 May 1982. It was the sixth race of the 1982 Formula One World Championship.

This was the first race following the death of Gilles Villeneuve at the Belgian Grand Prix two weeks previously. Consequently, Ferrari entered only one car, for Didier Pironi.

René Arnoux took pole position in his Renault and led until he spun off at the Swimming Pool on lap 15. Team-mate Alain Prost took over the lead and held it until the closing stages, when rain started to fall. On lap 74, three from the end, Prost pushed too hard and crashed into the Armco barriers coming out of the Chicane du Port (also known as the Dog Leg), handing the lead to Riccardo Patrese in the Brabham. Then, on lap 75, Patrese spun on oil at the Loews hairpin and stalled.

Pironi now led, but his battery was not charged properly before the race and the engine started misfiring on the last lap and finally stopped in the tunnel on the final lap. Andrea de Cesaris then ran out of fuel before he could pass Pironi, and Derek Daly, the next leader, had already lost the wings from his Williams after an accident and had also damaged his gearbox, which seized up before he could start the final lap. Patrese, who had managed to restart his car by rolling downhill and bump-starting, came through to take his first Formula One victory, with Pironi, de Cesaris and Daly classified second, third and sixth respectively.

BBC commentator and 1976 world champion James Hunt commented, "Well, we've got this ridiculous situation where we're all sitting by the start-finish line waiting for a winner to come past, and we don't seem to be getting one!"

Classification

Pre-qualifying 
A pre-qualifying session was held because of limits on the number of cars allowed on the Monaco track at once.

Qualifying

*Positions in red denote entrants that failed to qualify.

Race

Championship standings after the race

Drivers' Championship standings

Constructors' Championship standings

Note: Only the top five positions are included for both sets of standings.

References

May 1982 sports events in Europe
Monaco Grand Prix
Monaco Grand Prix
Grand Prix